Pirkko Vahtero (born 16 December 1936, Keuruu) is a Finnish graphic designer and heraldist. Over the course of time, Vahtero has designed a number of Finnish postage stamps and securities. She has designed about one-hundred-forty Finnish stamps and, in addition to the aforesaid, she had also designed stamps for other countries such as Costa Rica, Denmark, El Salvador, Iceland, Kuwait, Lebanon, Norway, Sweden and Venezuela.

Gallery of stamps designed by Vahtero

References 

Finnish graphic designers
Finnish heraldists
People from Keuruu
1936 births
Living people